The)) is a chess opening beginning with the moves:
1. e4 e5
2. Nf3 Nc6
3. Bc4 Bc5

"White aims to develop quickly – but so does Black. White can construct a  but in unfavourable conditions a centre which cannot provide a basis for further active play."

The name "Italian Game" is also commonly used; however, that name is sometimes used instead to describe all openings starting 1.e4 e5 2.Nf3 Nc6 3.Bc4, including 3...Nf6 (the Two Knights Defence) and other less common replies.

The Giuoco Piano is assigned codes C50 to C54 in the Encyclopaedia of Chess Openings.

History 
The Giuoco Piano is one of the oldest recorded openings. The Portuguese writer Pedro Damiano played it at the beginning of the 16th century and the Italian Greco played it at the beginning of the 17th century. The Giuoco Piano was popular through the 19th century, but modern refinements in defensive play have led most chess masters towards openings like the Ruy Lopez that offer White greater chances for long-term initiative.

In modern play, grandmasters have shown distinct preference for the slower and more strategic Giuoco Pianissimo (4.d3, or 4.c3 Nf6 5.d3). Anatoly Karpov used the Giuoco Pianissimo against Viktor Korchnoi twice in the 1981 World Championship match, with both games ending in a draw; Garry Kasparov used it against Joël Lautier at Linares 1994, resigning after 29 moves; Vladimir Kramnik chose it against Teimour Radjabov at Linares (2004); Viswanathan Anand used it to defeat Jon Hammer in 2010; Magnus Carlsen used it against Hikaru Nakamura at London 2011, winning in 41 moves and Ian Nepomniachtchi used it against Magnus Carlsen in the 2021 World Championship match, losing in 49 moves.

Variations 
The main continuations on White's fourth move are:
 4.c3, the Main line.
 4.b4, the Evans Gambit, in which White offers a pawn in return for rapid . This opening was popular in the 19th century, more than the standard Giuoco Piano.
 4.d3, the Giuoco Pianissimo.
 4.0-0, often with the intention of meeting 4...Nf6 with 5.d4, the Max Lange Gambit, with similar ideas to the Italian Gambit but with some transpositional differences.

Other continuations are:
 4.Nc3 Nf6, the Four Knights Variation.

Main line: 4.c3  
White plays 4.c3 in preparation for the central advance d2–d4. The main reply 4...Nf6 was first analysed by Greco in the 17th century. Alternatives include 4...Qe7, with the intention of holding on to the centre.

4...Nf6 
5.d4 exd4 6.cxd4
White can also try 6.e5, a line favoured by Evgeny Sveshnikov, when play usually continues 6...d5 7.Bb5 Ne4 8.cxd4 Bb6, with approximate . Additionally, White has a gambit alternative in 6.0-0, which Graham Burgess revived in the book 101 Chess Opening Surprises; the critical line runs 6...Nxe4 7.cxd4 d5 8.dxc5 dxc4 9.Qe2 Qd3. A very rare option is 6.b4 as was played in the brilliant game Dubov–Karjakin, Moscow 2020, the game continued 6...Bb6 7.e5 Ne4 (7...d5 is a critical alternative) 8.Bd5 Nxc3 9.Nxc3 dxc3 10.Bg5 Ne7 11.0-0 h6 12.Bh4 0-0 13.Re1 Qe8 14.Bb3 a5 15.Bf6 a4 16.Bc4 Ng6 17.Qd3 d5 18.exd6 Be6 19.Qxg6 and White went on to win.

6...Bb4+
White now has a choice between 7.Nc3 and 7.Bd2. 7.Nc3 usually leads to the Møller Attack, an aggressive line involving the sacrifice of a pawn, but it has been largely abandoned in high-level games, as Black gains the advantage with accurate defence. 7.Bd2 offers about equal chances.

7.Nc3 (including Greco Variation and Møller Attack) 
7.Nc3 Nxe4 8.0-0 (diagram) 

Greco encouraged an attack on White's  with 8.0-0, allowing 8...Nxc3, the Greco Variation. If 9.bxc3 Bxc3?! 10.Qb3 Bxa1?, White wins with 11.Bxf7+ Kf8 12.Bg5. Greco's game (probably analysis) continues 12...Ne7 13.Ne5 (13.Re1 and 13.Rxa1 also win) 13...d5 14.Qf3 Bf5 15.Be6 g6 16.Bh6+ Ke8 17.Bf7#. This trap is well-known, and Black can avoid it by playing 10...d5. For this reason, the Scottish master James Aitken proposed 10.Ba3!, which gives White the advantage. After 9.bxc3, best for Black is 9...d5! 10.cxb4 dxc4 11.Re1+ Ne7 12.Qa4+! Bd7 13.b5 0-0 14.Qxc4 Ng6!

In 1898 Danish player Jørgen Møller published analysis of the line in Tidsskrift for Skak. In what is now known as the Møller Attack, White sacrifices a pawn for development and the initiative:
 
8...Bxc3! 9.d5 
9.bxc3 is met with 9...d5!

9...Bf6
On 9...Ne5, a possible continuation is 10.bxc3 Nxc4 11.Qd4 f5 12.Qxc4 d6.

10.Re1 Ne7 11.Rxe4 d6 12.Bg5 Bxg5 13.Nxg5 h6!
13...0-0 14.Nxh7! has been analysed to a draw with best play, although Black has many opportunities to go wrong.

14.Bb5+
After 14.Qe2 hxg5 15.Re1 Be6! 16.dxe6 (White also can try 16.Qd2 c6! 17.dxe6 f6 18.Bd3 d5 19.Rg4 Qc7 20.h3 0-0-0 21.b4, attacking) 16...f6 17.Re3 c6 18.Rh3 Rxh3 19.gxh3 g6 it is doubtful that White has compensation for the sacrificed pawn, according to Grandmaster Larry Kaufman; 14.Qh5 0-0 15.Rae1 Ng6! (or 15...Nf5!) also favours Black.
 
14...Bd7 15.Qe2 Bxb5 16.Qxb5+ Qd7 17.Qxb7
17.Qe2 Kf8! wins a second pawn, as in Barczay–Portisch, Budapest 1969.

17...0-0 18.Rae1 Rab8 19.Qxa7 Nxd5 20.Qd4 Qf5 21.Nf3 Rb4
and Black is clearly better.

7.Bd2 
If White does not want to gambit material, 7.Bd2 is a good alternative. The game could continue 7...Bxd2+ (Kaufman recommends 7...Nxe4 8.Bxb4 Nxb4 9.Bxf7+ Kxf7 10.Qb3+ d5!? [10...Kf8 11.Qxb4+ Qe7 12.Qxe7+ Kxe7 is safer, reaching an equal endgame] 11.Ne5+ Ke6! 12.Qxb4 c5!?) 8.Nbxd2 d5 9.exd5 Nxd5 10.Qb3 Nce7 (10...Na5 is an alternative, inviting a repetition of moves after 11.Qa4+ Nc6 [threatening 12...Nb6] 12.Qb3 Na5) 11.0-0 0-0 12.Rfe1 c6. In this position White has more freedom, but the  can be a weakness. 7.Nbd2 is also a viable move for White, although this still only offers approximate equality. It has not been a popular choice among human players, but it seems to be recommended by computer engines. 7.Kf1?! has been largely abandoned.

4...Qe7 and alternatives 
After 5.d4 (5.0-0 usually transposes) Bb6,  White's options include 6.0-0, 6.d5, 6.a4 and 6.Bg5. A typical continuation is 6.0-0 d6 7.a4 a6 8.h3 Nf6 9.Re1 0-0 (Leonhardt–Spielmann, Ostend 1907).

4...Bb6 usually transposes after 5.d4 Qe7.

Other 4th moves for Black are considered inferior.

Giuoco Pianissimo: 4.d3  

With 4.d3, White plays the Giuoco Pianissimo (Italian: "Very Quiet Game", a name given by Adolf Anderssen). By avoiding an immediate confrontation in the centre, White prevents the early release of  through exchanges and enters a positional maneuvering game. 4.Nc3 Nf6 5.d3 is the Giuoco Pianissimo Deferred. 4.d3 f5 is the not-so-quiet Lucchini Gambit; there can follow 5.Ng5 f4, the Dubois Variation.

If White plays c2–c3, the position can take some characteristics of the Ruy Lopez if the bishop retreats to c2 via b3. This idea has been taken up by some grandmasters, such as Anish Giri, to avoid the drawish Berlin Defence in the Ruy Lopez. Despite its slow, drawish reputation, this variation became more popular after being taken up by John Nunn in the 1980s. The common move orders are 4.c3 Nf6 5.d3 (ECO C54), and transposition from the Bishop's Opening: 2.Bc4 Nf6 3.d3 Nc6 4.Nf3 Bc5 5.c3 or 5.0-0 d6 6.c3.

ECO codes 
Codes from the Encyclopaedia of Chess Openings are:
 C50 Italian Game, includes Giuoco Piano lines other than 4.c3 and 4.b4
 C51 Evans Gambit
 C52 Evans Gambit, with 4...Bxb4 5.c3 Ba5
 C53 Giuoco Piano, 4.c3, without 4...Nf6
 C54 Giuoco Piano, 4.c3 Nf6
 includes other than 5.d4 and 5.d3
 5.d4 exd4, without 6.cxd4
 5.d4 exd4 6.cxd4
 5.d3

References 

Bibliography

External links 

 "The Italian Game for beginners" Exeter Chess Club (UK) 

Chess openings
15th century in chess
16th century in chess